The  are three mountains revered by tradition in Japan.
They include:
Mount Fuji (富士山), 
Mount Haku (白山)  (The White Mountain) known for its UNESCO World Heritage Site, Shirakawa-gō 白川郷, and 
Mount Tate (立山) ('standing mountain') known for its onsen 温泉 (Hot springs) and the cobalt blue waters of Mikurigaike みくりが池. It is also known for its steaming Jigokudani 地獄谷 (Hell Valley).

Gallery

See also
 Sacred mountains

References

Japanese culture
Sacred mountains
Sacred mountains of Japan